Hypatopa gena is a moth in the family Blastobasidae. It is found in Costa Rica.

The length of the forewings is 7.1–7.5 mm. The forewings are greyish brown intermixed with a few brown scales. The hindwings are translucent pale brown, gradually darkening towards the apex.

Etymology
The specific name is derived from Latin gena (referring to the cheeks and the chin).

References

Moths described in 2013
Hypatopa